Air Marshal Kevin Ronald Short,  is a Royal New Zealand Air Force officer, serving as Chief of Defence Force since 1 July 2018.

Short joined the Air Force in 1976. He served as Commander, Crib Rotation 9, the Provincial Reconstruction Team, in the early years of New Zealand's deployment to Bamiyan, Afghanistan.

In June 2011 Short was appointed Deputy Chief of Air Force, before being appointed Commander Joint Forces New Zealand from 25 February 2013. He assumed the role of Vice Chief of Defence Force on 31 March 2014. After four years in the post, Short was promoted air marshal and succeeded Lieutenant General Tim Keating as Chief of Defence Force on 1 July 2018.

On 6 July 2022, Short was appointed an Honorary Officer of the Order of Australia for his "distinguished service in fostering the military relationship between Australia and New Zealand through exceptional leadership, unwavering commitment, strategic foresight and uncompromising professionalism".

References

|-

|-

Honorary Officers of the Order of Australia
Living people
New Zealand military personnel of the War in Afghanistan (2001–2021)
Royal New Zealand Air Force air marshals
Year of birth missing (living people)